Echaporã is a municipality in the state of São Paulo in Brazil. The population is 6,064 (2020 est.) in an area of 516 km². The elevation is 700 m.

Notable people
 
 
Roberta Murgo (born 1987), Brazilian model

References

Municipalities in São Paulo (state)